The 2014 Alberta Scotties Tournament of Hearts, the provincial women's curling championship for Alberta, was held from January 8 to 12 at the Sylvan Lake Curling Club in Sylvan Lake. The winning Val Sweeting team represented Alberta at the 2014 Scotties Tournament of Hearts in Montreal.

Teams
The teams are listed as follows:

Knockout Draw Brackets
The draw is listed as follows:

A event

B event

C event

Knockout results

Draw 1
Wednesday, January 8, 9:30 am

Draw 2
Wednesday, January 8, 6:30 pm

Draw 3
Thursday, January 9, 9:00 am

Draw 4
Thursday, January 9, 2:00 pm

Draw 5
Thursday, January 9, 6:30 pm

Draw 6
Friday, January 10, 9:00 am

Draw 7
Friday, January 10, 2:00 pm

Draw 8
Friday, January 10, 6:30 pm

Draw 9
Saturday, January 11, 1:00 pm

Playoffs

A vs. B
Saturday, January 11, 6:30 pm

C1 vs. C2
Saturday, January 11, 6:30 pm

Semifinal
Sunday, January 12, 8:30 am

Final
Sunday, January 12, 1:30 pm

References

External links

Curling in Alberta
Alberta
Alberta Scotties Tournament of Hearts